Alexander Low, Lord Low (1845–1910) was a 19th/20th  century Scottish law lord who served as a Senator of the College of Justice.

Life
He was born on 23 October 1845 the son of James Low of The Laws, in Berwickshire and his wife, Jessy Turnbull of Abbey St. Bathans. He was educated at Cheltenham College then studied Moral Science at St Andrews University and St John's College, Cambridge. He then began a Law course at Edinburgh University. He passed the Scottish Bar as an advocate in 1870.

In 1875 he was working as an advocate from 1 Queensferry Street in Edinburgh's West End.

In 1889 he was made Sheriff of Ross and Cromarty. In November 1890 he was elected a Senator of the College of Justice.

In 1895 he was living at 12 Drumsheugh Gardens, a very fine Victorian townhouse.

He resigned on grounds of ill-health in 1904 and died at the family home of The Laws on 14 October 1910 and was buried at Whitsome churchyard.

Cases

Lord Low's most noteworthy case was the Free Church of Scotland v. the United Free Church of Scotland in 1901 (formally known as Bannatyne v. Overtoun) relating to Union between the United Presbyterian Church (Scotland) and the Free Church of Scotland (1843–1900) to create the United Free Church of Scotland. The case centred on the issue as to whether or not the church as a body or the congregations owned church property, and echoed earlier arguments of the Disruption of 1843. Lord Low judged in favour of the United Church and the Free Church lost their property. However, this was overturned by the judicial function of the House of Lords  in 1904. The matter was remedied by the Churches (Scotland) Act 1905 and two subsequent Royal Commissions.

Publications

Editor of the "Scottish Law Reporter".

Family
He married Annie Adele Mackenzie (1854-1925), daughter of Donald Mackenzie, Lord Mackenzie.

Artistic Recognition

He was portrayed by Fiddes Watt.

References

1845 births
1910 deaths
People from Berwickshire
People educated at Cheltenham College
Alumni of the University of St Andrews
Alumni of St John's College, Cambridge
Alumni of the University of Edinburgh
Senators of the College of Justice
19th-century Scottish judges